North Canaan is a town in Litchfield County, Connecticut, United States. The population was 3,211 at the 2020 census. The town center is still called "Canaan", being the main town center of the old town of Canaan prior to North Canaan splitting off as its own town.

The Union Depot building, a former railroad station, has been restored and is the site of Great Falls Brewing Company since 2018.

Geography
North Canaan is in northwestern Litchfield County and is bordered to the north by Berkshire County, Massachusetts.

Principal communities
Canaan village (not the same as the town of Canaan to the south)
Canaan Valley
East Canaan (has its own post office)
Sodom
East Sheffield

Demographics

As of the census of 2000, there were 3,350 people, 1,343 households, and 864 families residing in the town. The racial makeup of the town was 96.93% White, 1.19% African American, 0.18% Native American, 0.18% Asian, 0.39% from other races, and 1.13% from two or more races. Hispanic or Latino of any race were 2.36% of the population.

There were 1,343 households, out of which 30.0% had children under the age of 18 living with them, 50.4% were married couples living together, 9.9% had a female householder with no husband present, and 35.6% were non-families. 30.2% of all households were made up of individuals, and 13.9% had someone living alone who was 65 years of age or older.  The average household size was 2.38 and the average family size was 2.98.

In the town, the population was spread out, with 23.3% under the age of 18, 6.7% from 18 to 24, 28.1% from 25 to 44, 22.9% from 45 to 64, and 19.0% who were 65 years of age or older.  The median age was 40 years. For every 100 females, there were 92.6 males.  For every 100 females age 18 and over, there were 89.1 males.

The median income for a household in the town was $39,020, and the median income for a family was $52,292. Males had a median income of $34,135 versus $23,705 for females. The per capita income for the town was $18,971.  About 3.3% of families and 5.8% of the population were below the poverty line, including 3.1% of those under age 18 and 5.0% of those age 65 or over.

Transportation
The main highways of the town are U.S. Route 7 (north-south) and U.S. Route 44 (east-west). US 7 leads north  to Great Barrington, Massachusetts, and south  to Danbury, while US 44 leads west  to Millerton, New York, and east  to Hartford, the capital of Connecticut.

The Canaan Union Depot, originally built in 1872, was heavily damaged by a fire in 2001 and was under restoration by the Connecticut Railroad Historical Association in 2003. It lies in the center of North Canaan along a re-formed Housatonic Railroad, although it is now the Great Falls Brewing Company.

Education

North Canaan is a member of Regional School District 01, which also includes the towns of Canaan, Cornwall, Kent, Salisbury, and Sharon. Public school students attend North Canaan Elementary School from grades K–8 and Housatonic Valley Regional High School in Falls Village from grades 9–12.

References

External links

Town of North Canaan official website
Town of North Canaan Land Use Regulations

 
Towns in Litchfield County, Connecticut
Towns in the New York metropolitan area
Towns in Connecticut